Homa Dorothy Parvaz born in Isfahan, Iran, is an editor at NPR.

Parvaz entered Syria at Damascus on Friday, April 29, 2011, to cover the Syrian protests and was not heard from for the next nineteen days. After it was reported that she was missing, campaigns were formed on Twitter and Facebook to press the Syrian government to free her. Syria revealed that Parvaz had been deported to Iran. On May 18, 2011, Parvaz was released by Iranian authorities.

Born in Iran, she holds passports from Iran, Canada, and the United States.

She is an editor at NPR.

Early life 
Homa Dorothy Parvaz was born in October 1971 in Tehran, Iran to an Iranian father and an American mother. She lived in Iran until she was ten years old, then spent the next four years in Dubai. Parvaz moved to Canada with her family in 1985, ultimately graduating from a Canadian high school.

Education 
Parvaz obtained her undergraduate degree in English literature from the University of British Columbia. She subsequently obtained a master's degree in journalism from the University of Arizona.

She has been the recipient of journalism fellowships at Harvard and Cambridge.

Career 
After obtaining her degree from the University of British Columbia, Parvaz worked for the English language edition of the Asahi Shimbun in Japan.

Following her sojourn in Japan, Parvaz obtained her master's degree in journalism from the University of Arizona. She moved to Seattle in 1999, where she worked first for The Seattle Times, then as a columnist, feature writer, and ultimately editorial board member for the Seattle Post-Intelligencer. After the latter ceased to exist as a print newspaper, and following her journalism fellowships, she accepted employment with Al Jazeera, for whom she reported on the 2011 Japanese earthquake and tsunami.

Parvaz is now the global politics reporter at ThinkProgress. She is based in Washington, D.C.

Disappearance 
Parvaz arrived in Syria on Friday, April 29, 2011, via Qatar Airways to cover recent protests there for Al Jazeera. She was not heard from after landing at the airport, and it was suspected that she had been detained at the airport. Her family feared for her safety. Syria's efforts to limit foreign media coverage of recent events had previously led to the detention of numerous journalists.

On May 2, 2011, Parvaz's family released the following statement:

Voices calling for her release included her immediate family, her fiancé (Luxembourg-based attorney Todd Barker), Cambridge University, Al Jazeera, and the Iranian government. With friends around the world, Parvaz's story was widely reported, with press freedom advocacy groups also taking up her cause. Other voices calling for her release included Amnesty International, the Doha Centre for Media Freedom, Al Karama for Human Rights, the Committee to Protect Journalists, Reporters Without Borders, and the U.S. State Department.

It was reported on May 5, 2011, that Parvaz was being held by the Syrian government, which Syria confirmed.  Her family and friends called for her release. Facebook and Twitter campaigns were also underway.

It was further reported on May 7, 2011, that U.S. Ambassador Robert Ford met with a senior Syrian official in an attempt to obtain more information about Parvaz.

The family released the following additional statement:

Syrian newspaper Al Watan reported that the Syrian government claimed Parvaz left Syria on May 1, 2011, after being denied entry to the country because she held a tourist visa instead of a journalist visa. This claim was unconfirmed, most notably by Parvaz herself.

As of May 11, 2011, unsubstantiated reports had emerged indicating that the Syrian government handed Parvaz over to Iranian authorities and that she might be held in Tehran.

On May 18, 2011, after disappearing on assignment in Syria for 19 days, Dorothy was released and sent back to Doha by Iranian authorities. By the end of the day, she had released an article detailing her experiences. Syria claimed she had entered Syria illegally with multiple passports, including an expired Iranian one. However, there was no issue with her passports. Her Iranian one was extended and stamped upon entry by Syrian immigration.

Parvaz was named the 2013 recipient of the McGill Medal for Journalistic Courage from the Grady College of Journalism and Mass Communication.

Notes 

Living people
Al Jazeera people
1971 births
Women war correspondents
University of British Columbia alumni
University of Arizona alumni
The Seattle Times people
People from Tehran
War correspondents of the Syrian civil war
Iranian expatriates in the United Arab Emirates